Display motion blur, also called HDTV blur and LCD motion blur, refers to several visual artifacts (anomalies or unintended effects affecting still or moving images) that are frequently found on modern consumer high-definition television sets and flat panel displays for computers.

Causes
Many motion blur factors have existed for a long time in film and video (e.g. slow camera shutter speed). The emergence of digital video, and HDTV display technologies, introduced many additional factors that now contribute to motion blur. The following factors are generally the primary or secondary causes of perceived motion blur in video. In many cases, multiple factors can occur at the same time within the entire chain, from the original media or broadcast, all the way to the receiver end.

 Pixel response time on LCD displays (motion blur caused by slow pixel response time)
 Lower camera shutter speeds common in Hollywood production films (blur in the content of the film), and common in miniaturized camera sensors that require more light.
 Blur from eye tracking fast-moving objects on sample-and-hold LCD, plasma, or microdisplay.
 Resolution resampling (blur due to resizing image to fit the native resolution of the HDTV); not a motion blur.
 Deinterlacing by the display, and telecine processing by studios. These processes can soften images, and/or introduce motion-speed irregularities.
 Compression artifacts, present in digital video streams, can contribute additional blur during fast motion.

Motion blur has been a more severe problem for LCD displays, due to their sample-and-hold nature. Even in situations when pixel response time is very short, motion blur remains a problem because their pixels remain lit, unlike CRT phosphors that merely flash briefly. Reducing the time an LCD pixel is lit can be accomplished via turning off the backlight for part of a refresh. This reduces motion blur due to eye tracking by decreasing the time the backlight is on. In addition, strobed backlights can also be combined with motion interpolation to reduce eye-tracking-based motion blur.

Fixes

Strobed backlights
Different manufacturers use many names for their strobed backlight technologies for reducing motion blur on sample-and-hold LCD displays. Generic names include black frame insertion and scanning backlight.

 Philips created Aptura, also known as ClearLCD, to strobe the backlight in order to reduce the sample time and thus the retinal blurring due to sample-and-hold.
 Samsung uses strobed backlighting as part of their "Clear Motion Rate" technology. This was also called "LED Motion Plus" in some previous Samsung displays.
 BenQ developed SPD (Simulated Pulse Drive), also more commonly known as "black frame insertion", and claim that their images are as stable and clear as CRTs. This is conceptually similar to a strobing backlight.
 Sharp Corporation use a "scanning backlight" which rapidly flashes the backlight in a sequence from the top to the bottom of the screen, during every frame.
 Nvidia has licensed a strobe backlight technology called LightBoost to display manufacturers. This is normally used to reduce crosstalk during 3D Vision, which utilize shutter glasses; however, it also eliminates motion blur due to its ability to keep pixel transitions in the dark between LCD refreshes. A 'hack' method or utility tool is needed to take advantage of LightBoost backlights for blur reduction benefits.
 BenQ later developed their own native "BenQ Blur Reduction" technology, integrated into several of their gaming monitors. This offers a strobe backlight which can be easily turned on and off by the user. There is no control over the strobe timing or strobe length for the user, although third party utilities have been produced for this purpose.  Newer firmware for the BenQ Blur Reduction monitors allow direct user control over the strobe pulse (timing) and strobe length (persistence) directly from the Service Menu.  More customization is available by using a higher Vertical Total (from 1498 to 1502, depending on what does not cause errors), which effectively tricks the Mstar scaler into working with a larger blanking interval, as if the vertical screen size were longer.  This effectively pushes the strobe crosstalk farther down the bottom of the display, improving strobe image quality, but with some drawbacks (like a faint scanlines effect, also seen in strobe LightBoost mode).
 Eizo have also introduced their 'Turbo 240' option used so far on their Eizo Foris FG2421 gaming display. This allows the user to control the strobe backlight on/off easily to reduced perceived motion blur
 LG introduced a similar 'Motion 240' option on their 24GM77 gaming monitor
 ULMB is a technique provided alongside NVIDIA's G-sync technology, and linked to the G-sync monitor module. It is an alternative option to using G-sync (and cannot be used at the same time), offering the user instead an "Ultra Low Motion Blur" mode. This has been provided on various monitors already featuring G-sync (e.g. Asus ROG Swift PG278Q, Acer Predator XB270HU). For newer games with a higher demand for graphical power, G-Sync is preferable over ULMB.

Motion interpolation

Some displays use motion interpolation to run at a higher refresh rate, such as 100 Hz or 120 Hz to reduce motion blur.  Motion interpolation generates artificial in-between frames that are inserted between the real frames. The advantage is reduced motion blur on sample-and-hold displays such as LCD.

There can be side-effects, including the soap opera effect if interpolation is enabled while watching movies (24 fps material).  Motion interpolation also adds input lag, which makes it undesirable for interactive activity such as computers and video games.

Recently, 240 Hz interpolation have become available, along with displays that claim an equivalence to 480 Hz or 960 Hz. Some manufacturers use a different terminology such as Samsung's "Clear Motion Rate 960" instead of "Hz". This avoids incorrect usage of the "Hz" terminology, due to multiple motion blur reduction technologies in use, including both motion interpolation and strobed backlights.

Manufacturer Terminology:

 JVC uses "Clear Motion Drive".
 LG uses "TruMotion".
 Samsung uses "Auto Motion Plus" (AMP), "Clear Motion Rate" (CMR), and "Motion Rate".
 Sony uses "Motionflow".
 Toshiba uses "Clear Frame".
 Sharp uses "AquoMotion".
 Vizio uses "Clear Action".

Laser TV

Laser TV has the potential to eliminate double imaging and motion artifacts by utilizing a scanning architecture similar to the way that a CRT works.  Laser TV is generally not yet available from many manufacturers.  Claims have been made on television broadcasts such as KRON 4 News' Coverage of Laser TV from October 2006, but no consumer-grade laser television sets have made any significant improvements in reducing any form of motion artifacts since that time.  One recent development in laser display technology has been the phosphor-excited laser, as demonstrated by Prysm's newest displays.  These displays currently scan at 240 Hz, but are currently limited to a 60 Hz input.  This has the effect of presenting four distinct images when eye tracking a fast-moving object seen from a 60 Hz input source.

There has also been Microvision's Laser MEMS Based Pico Projector Pro, which has no display lag, no input lag and no persistence or motion blur.

LED and OLED
Both OLED and Sony's Crystal LED displays use an independent light source for every pixel, without a traditional CCFL or LED backlight used in LCD.  Sony's Crystal LED uses individual light emitting diodes for each pixel, instead of using LED as a backlight. Several displays demonstrated at the CES 2012 have been the first modern high-definition television sets to overcome the motion artifacts by selectively blanking parts of the screen.  Both OLED and "Crystal LED" technologies also have response times far shorter than LCD technology, and can reduce motion blur significantly. However, all consumer OLED Displays are sample-and-hold, which leads to the same amount of motion blur as a traditional LCD Display.

See also 

 Interlaced video
 Telecine judder

References

External links
Motion Blur Reduction Backlights
 Pursuit camera photography of LCD motion blur
 Article in HDTV Magazine that does a good job of covering motion blur on LCD panels
 Link describing cause of motion blur from sample and hold techniques and reduction using LED backlighting
 TestUFO.com: Motion test animations that also demonstrates display motion blur
 Techmind.org: LCD technology and stationary test patterns
 1080p and framerates explained
 Methods for 3:2 Pull Down
 BenQ monitor that uses strobing to reduce sample-and-hold artifacts due to motion eye tracking
 Windows application that demonstrates retinal blur due to sample and hold displays

High-definition television
Television technology